The House Liberty Caucus was a congressional caucus consisting of conservative, libertarian, and libertarian conservative members of the United States House of Representatives. It hosted a bimonthly luncheon in Washington, D.C. The group was founded by Rep. Justin Amash of Michigan and joined by Republican members who wanted to "focus on specific issues like economic freedom, individual liberty, and following the Constitution". During his time in Congress, Jared Polis of Colorado was the only Democratic member of the caucus. The caucus was characterized as "conservative with a libertarian emphasis" and was associated with the Tea Party movement. When the 117th Congress convened, there was not new leadership.

History 

Prior to the formal creation of the House Liberty Caucus, Rep. Ron Paul hosted a luncheon in Washington, D.C. every Thursday for a group of Republican members of the House of Representatives that he called the Liberty Caucus. The group was closely connected to the political action committee known as the Republican Liberty Caucus and "support[ed] individual rights, limited government and free enterprise".

After the 112th Congress began and Ron Paul switched his focus to his presidential campaign, his luncheon was replaced by a formal congressional member organization called the House Liberty Caucus and chaired by Justin Amash. In June 2014, the caucus supported Raúl Labrador's campaign for House Majority Leader.

Members 
Current Members:
 Andy Biggs of Arizona
 Warren Davidson of Ohio
 Paul Gosar of Arizona
 Morgan Griffith of Virginia
 Jim Jordan of Ohio
 Thomas Massie of Kentucky
 Cathy McMorris Rodgers of Washington
 Scott Perry of Pennsylvania
 Tim Walberg of Michigan
Former Members:
 Justin Amash of Michigan – retired in 2020
 Kerry Bentivolio of Michigan – lost renomination in 2014
 Paul Broun of Georgia – ran unsuccessfully for the Senate in 2014
Jason Chaffetz of Utah – resigned in 2017
 Curt Clawson of Florida – retired in 2016
 Scott Garrett of New Jersey – defeated in 2016 general election
 Tom Graves of Georgia – resigned in 2020
 Vicky Hartzler of Missouri – running for the 2022 United States Senate election in Missouri
 Tim Huelskamp of Kansas – lost renomination in 2016
 Walter Jones of North Carolina – died 2019
 Cynthia Lummis of Wyoming – retired from the House in 2016
 Mick Mulvaney of South Carolina – appointed as Director of the Office of Management and Budget in 2017
 Jared Polis of Colorado (Democrat) – ran successfully for 2018 Colorado gubernatorial election, currently Governor of Colorado. Polis was the only Democratic member of the Liberty Caucus.
 Matt Salmon of Arizona – retired in 2016
 Steve Stockman of Texas – ran unsuccessfully for the Senate in 2014
 Marlin Stutzman of Indiana – ran unsuccessfully for the Senate in 2016
 Rob Woodall of Georgia – retired in 2020

See also 
 Freedom Caucus
 Libertarian Republican
 Libertarian conservatism
 Republican Liberty Caucus
 Republican Study Committee
 Second Amendment Caucus
 Tea Party Caucus
 Tea Party movement

References

External links 
 House Liberty Caucus

Ideological caucuses of the United States Congress
Political organizations based in the United States
Republican Party (United States)
2011 in American politics
Republican Party (United States) organizations
Libertarian organizations based in the United States
Factions in the Republican Party (United States)
Tea Party movement
Conservative organizations in the United States
2011 establishments in Washington, D.C.